Aphantophryne nana is a species of frog in the family Microhylidae. It is endemic to the Philippines and is known with certainty only from the island of Camiguin. It is unclear whether similar frogs from northeast Mindanao are referable to this species. It was 
described as Oreophryne nana, but based on molecular data it was moved to Aphantophryne in 2017. Common names Camiguin cross frog, Camiguin narrow-mouthed frog, and volcano cross frog have been coined for the species.

Description
Aphantophryne nana are small, moderately slender-bodied frogs. Adult females in the type series measure  in snout–vent length; no males were collected. The head is broader than it is long. The snout is short and bluntly round–pointed. The canthus rostralis is rounded. The tympanum is distinct. The fingers and the toes are dilated into moderately large disks (with the exception of the first finger). Skin is smooth. Preserved specimens are dusky brown, apart from the blackish snout, upper eyelids, and axillary and loreal regions.

Aphantophryne nana differs from Aphantophryne anulata by  the absence of subarticular tubercles on the hand, but the diagnostic value of this character has been questioned because specimens from Mindanao show a variable degree of distinctiveness for this trait.

Habitat and conservation
Aphantophryne nana occurs in mossy and montane rainforests. Eggs presumably belonging to this species have been found under mosses. Development is direct, without a free-living tadpole stage.

Aphantophryne nana is rare on Camiguin. Shifting agriculture and illegal logging threaten its habitat at lower altitudes.

References

nana
Endemic fauna of the Philippines
Amphibians of the Philippines
Fauna of Camiguin
Amphibians described in 1967
Taxa named by Walter Creighton Brown
Taxonomy articles created by Polbot